Trevor John Lewis (16 August 1919 – 19 May 1995) was a British water polo player. He competed in the men's tournament at the 1948 Summer Olympics.

References

1919 births
1995 deaths
British male water polo players
Olympic water polo players of Great Britain
Water polo players at the 1948 Summer Olympics
Sportspeople from Swansea